Jerry Maren (born Gerard Marenghi; January 24, 1920 – May 24, 2018) was an American actor who played a Munchkin member of the Lollipop Guild in the 1939 Metro-Goldwyn-Mayer film The Wizard of Oz. He became the last surviving adult Munchkin following the death of Ruth Duccini in 2014, and was also the last surviving cast member with a specifically identifiable speaking or singing role.

Early life
Gerard Marenghi, eventually known as Jerry Maren, was born in Lynn, Massachusetts, the youngest of eleven or twelve children. His father, Emil Marenghi, worked at a shoe factory. His four brothers were six feet (182.88 cm) or taller by 1939.

At the age of 12, Maren started taking dancing lessons with his sister. He toured around New England with his dance instructor with an act called Three Steps and a Hop and was noticed by Metro-Goldwyn-Mayer scouts who were looking for three little people who could sing and dance.

Career 
Maren received a telegram, just after graduating from high school, asking him to come to California to work on a film. He was offered nearly $100 per week plus expenses.

In The Wizard of Oz, he played the green-garbed member of the Lollipop Guild (between Jakob "Jackie" Gerlich and Harry Earles), handing a lollipop to Dorothy Gale (Judy Garland). Maren was 18 or 19 years old when he shot his scenes for The Wizard of Oz in the latter part of 1938 and early 1939. At that time he stood just . (Hormone treatments allowed Maren to reach a height of  later in life.)

Maren began to cultivate his performance talents by creating a persona as a thirteen-year-old during school vacations. He began attending singing and dancing lessons in his early teens, and enjoyed them so much that he opted to team up with his teacher in an act known as "Three Steps and a Hop." The idea was a success on stage, and the group toured the New England circuit for a considerable length of time. In the same year as The Wizard of Oz, Maren appeared in an Our Gang short Tiny Troubles as the criminal "Light-Fingered Lester", and was an extra in the Western film The Terror of Tiny Town.

After The Wizard of Oz, Maren had roles in several movies and television shows, including a circus performer in the Marx Brothers film At The Circus (1939) and as an ape in Battle for the Planet of the Apes (1973). He is also featured, along with fellow Munchkin Billy Curtis, in American International Pictures' release Little Cigars (1973), about a gang of "midgets" on a crime spree.

In the 1950s, Maren worked as Little Oscar for the Oscar Mayer Company and as Buster Brown in television and radio commercials. He later joined his friend Billy Barty in organizing Little People of America. He also portrayed Mayor McCheese and The TurkeyBoy in commercials for McDonald's. Maren was a stuntman on the 1975 film The Apple Dumpling Gang and said he "nearly got killed" filming a scene where a buckboard went out of control.

From 1969 until 1971, Maren appeared on The Andy Williams Show on a regular basis as the Little General.  In the late 1970s, Maren was the dapper little man in top hat and tuxedo on The Gong Show, heralding each show's big finish with an onslaught of confetti as Milton DeLugg's band played "Hoop Dee Doo". He made a notable appearance in the episode "Felix the Horseplayer" of The Odd Couple as Harry Tallman, a racehorse exerciser who gives Oscar tips on winning horses. In 1982 he played Morris the bellboy, a regular character in the ABC sitcom No Soap, Radio.

Maren had a walk-on role in an episode of Seinfeld ("The Yada Yada") and played a mime in the 2010-released comedy horror movie Dahmer vs. Gacy. He also starred in the Eric Swelstad-directed horror movie Frankenstein Rising (2009). In February 2009, Maren performed in Project Lodestar Sagas as Thaddeus, opposite former MGM child actress Margaret O'Brien in the lead role of Livia Wells.

Promotional appearances

On November 21, 2007, Maren appeared with six other Munchkin actors at the unveiling of a Hollywood Star for the Wizard of Oz Munchkins on the Hollywood Walk of Fame. The other actors were Mickey Carroll, Ruth Duccini, Margaret Pellegrini, Meinhardt Raabe, Karl Slover, and Clarence Swensen.

On June 3, 2010, Maren appeared at Turning Stone Resort & Casino in Verona, New York, to promote a new Wizard of Oz slot machine.

After 2011, Maren stopped traveling or appearing at any of the Oz Festivals held throughout the country, but he did appear for a handprint and footprint ceremony at Grauman's Chinese Theatre in Hollywood on September 18, 2013.

Personal life
Maren was married to Elizabeth Barrington from 1975 until her death at age 69 on January 27, 2011. He lived in southern California.

On February 29, 2016, it was reported that Maren had died of pancreatic cancer, but these reports were false. He posted a video on Instagram to say that he was alive and well, and according to friend Steve Cox, he didn't have cancer.

When The Hollywood Reporter attempted to contact Maren for a story on little people in Hollywood in August 2016, Maren's caretakers informed the reporter that he was too frail to make further appearances or conduct interviews.

Death
Maren died at a nursing facility center in La Jolla, California on May 24, 2018, aged 98, from a combination of old age-related diseases including cachexia, heart failure and senile dementia. He outlived all the major cast members as well as the original Tin Man Buddy Ebsen. Maren left no immediate survivors. He was the last surviving member of The Wizard of Ozs adult Munchkin cast, the only Munchkin alive when extra Shep Houghton died in 2016, as well as the last surviving actor to have co-starred in a film starring the Marx Brothers.

Filmography

Film

Television

Notes

References

Further reading
 Stephen Cox, "The Munchkins of Oz" Cumberland House 
 Short and Sweet: The Life and Times of the Lollipop Munchkin (Paperback) by Jerry Maren (Author) Pub. Date: June 2007

External links
 
 

1920 births
2018 deaths
Deaths from dementia in California
20th-century American male actors
21st-century American male actors
Actors with dwarfism
American male film actors
American male television actors
American memoirists
American people of Italian descent
Burials at Forest Lawn Memorial Park (Hollywood Hills)
Male actors from Boston
Writers from Boston